In computer networking, a peer group is a group of functional units in the same layer (see e.g. OSI model) of a network, by analogy with peer group. See also peer-to-peer (P2P) networking which is a specific type of networking relying on basically equal end hosts rather than on a hierarchy of devices.

Computer networking